Lights Action were a British rock quintet from London/Oxford/Chelmsford made up of Patrick Currier (vocals), Karl Bareham (guitar), Chris Moorhead (guitar/keyboards), Alex Leeder (bass) and Steven Durham (drums). The band broke up in 2011.

Initial releases
Their first single, "Satellites", was released on 7 May 2007. The single was re-released as a limited edition double A-Side single at the end of April 2008, backed with the song "Us Against the World". Their second single, "Story Of A Broken Boy", was released on 1 October 2007. Lights Action's third single, "Aurora" was released on 7 April 2008.

Their début mini-album All Eyes to the Morning Sun, was released in April through Xtra Mile Recordings.

Debut album
Their début album Welcome to the New Cold World was released on 2 March 2009 through the band's own, "Colt Signals" label. Unlike the preceding synth-driven mini-album, the album used instruments such as piano, lap steel, hammond organ, pipe organ, mellotron and a live string quartet. Reviews compared their epic style to that of Arcade Fire, Coldplay and U2.

The first album single to be released was "Battle of Lovers", which was given away as a free download through the band's website.

The final song on the album, "The Bottom of the Sea" featured a choir including Dallas Green (Alexisonfire/City and Colour), Kenny Bridges (Moneen), singer/songwriter Richard Walters and Oxford based band, A Silent Film.

Discography

Singles

Mini albums

Albums

Band members
Patrick Currier - Vocals
Karl Bareham - Guitar
Chris Moorhead - Guitar/Keys
Alex Leeder - Bass
Steven Durham - Drums

References

External links
 Bebo
 ReverbNation
 MySpace
 Blogspot
 New Cold World
 Interview on Rockmidgets.com
 Welcome To The New Cold World review on Rockmidgets

English indie rock groups